Qader Eshpari, born in September 1967 is an American singer. He is of the new generation of exiled artists who have achieved fame outside of Afghanistan.  He currently lives in Fremont, California, United States from where he continues his music career through his own recording studio.

Early years

Qader Eshpari was born in a suburb of Kabul. To avoid the impending war in Afghanistan, his family moved to Pakistan, then to Germany and a while later they immigrated to the United States.

After finishing high school in Las Vegas, Nevada, Qader moved to California to pursue higher education. There he earned a degree in Computer Science. After working for IBM as a Technical Support Engineer for three years, he decided to return to his childhood passion once again. He started composing music and worked with various other musicians to start a career in this field professionally.

Involvements 
Qader has a deep interest in Indian movie culture and music and much of his recorded songs reflect this.  His renditions of popular Indian film songs are present in almost every album.  He is also an active traveler and has toured all over United States, Canada, Australia, Europe and India. Most of these trips have been concert performances. During his 2006 visit to Afghanistan he sang to a group of disadvantaged children at an orphanage.

Contribution 
Qader's has been credited with creating and arranging music for over 100 albums for various singers from Afghanistan. Other achievements include an English song: Dance with Me (from his Sahil Eshq CD). Qader Eshpari's first professional music video is released and it is called Ashiana.

Discography

Albums 
  1996: Soroode Asheqi
  1997: Sabrina
  1998: Sia Moo
  2001: Only You
  2003: Sahil Eshq
  2005: Naazi Jaan
  2009: Generation X

Videography 
 2007: Ashiana (DVD)

References 

1967 births
Living people
Pashtun people
Afghan musicians
Afghan composers
People from Kabul
Afghan Tajik people
Afghan male singers
Persian-language singers
Afghan expatriates in Pakistan
20th-century Afghan male singers
21st-century Afghan male singers
Afghan emigrants to the United States
Afghan expatriates in the United States